The Partner is an American reality television show that is broadcast on CNBC. The series features entrepreneur Marcus Lemonis auditioning ten candidates to help run businesses Lemonis has invested in during his other CNBC program The Profit.

Candidates will be auditioned over a six-week period, with one being selected to be Lemonis' partner. The winner will receive a three-year contract including a salary of US$163,000 and a 1% equity stake in Lemonis' portfolio. The series drew comparisons to another business themed reality format The Apprentice.

The series was announced on January 14, 2016 and was originally scheduled to debut in Summer 2016. However, the series would debut on March 7, 2017.

Contestants

Episodes

See also
 The Apprentice
 The Profit

References

2010s American reality television series
2017 American television series debuts
2017 American television series endings
American television spin-offs
CNBC original programming